Atan, is a village in the Lori Province of Armenia. It belongs to the municipality of Tumanyan.

References

Populated places in Lori Province